In mathematics, the three classical Pythagorean means are the arithmetic mean (AM), the geometric mean (GM), and the harmonic mean (HM). These means were studied with proportions by Pythagoreans and later generations of Greek mathematicians because of their importance in geometry and music.

Definition
They are defined by:

Properties
Each mean, has the following properties:

 First order homogeneity 
 Invariance under exchange 
 Monotonicity 
 Idempotence 

Monotonicity and idempotence together imply that a mean of a set always lies between the extremes of the set.

The harmonic and arithmetic means are reciprocal duals of each other for positive arguments:
 

while the geometric mean is its own reciprocal dual:

Inequalities among means 

 

This is a generalization of the inequality of arithmetic and geometric means and a special case of an inequality for generalized means.

The study of the Pythagorean means is closely related to the study of majorization and Schur-convex functions. The harmonic and geometric means are concave symmetric functions of their arguments, and hence Schur-concave, while the arithmetic mean is a linear function of its arguments, so both concave and convex.

History

Almost everything that we know about the Pythagorean means came from arithmetic handbooks written in the first and second century. Nicomachus of Gerasa says that they were “acknowledged by all the ancients, Pythagoras, Plato and Aristotle.” Their earliest known use is a fragment of the Pythagorean philosopher Archytas of Tarentum:

The name "harmonic mean", according to Iamblichus,  was coined by Archytas and Hippasus. The Pythagorean means also appear in Plato's Timaeus. Another evidence of their early use is a commentary by  Pappus.

The term "mean" (μεσότης, mesótēs in Ancient Greek) appears in the Neopythagorean arithmetic handbooks in connection with the term "proportion" (ἀναλογία, analogía in Ancient Greek).

Trivia

The smallest pairs of different natural numbers for which the arithmetic, geometric and harmonic means are all also natural numbers are (5,45) and (10,40).

See also
 Arithmetic–geometric mean
 Average
 Golden ratio
 Kepler triangle

References

External links

Means